Douglas Knapp (August 5, 1949 – February 3, 2020) was an American cinematographer and camera operator. His film credits include The All-American Girl, Dark Star, Assault on Precinct 13, and The First Nudie Musical.

Life and career
Douglas Knapp was born in Tulsa, Oklahoma on August 5, 1949. Growing up in Calgary, Alberta, he attended Western Canada High School. In 1972, he graduated from the USC School of Cinematic Arts, where he attended with John Carpenter.

Knapp served as the cinematographer on Dark Star and Assault on Precinct 13, both of which were directed by Carpenter. He also served as the camera operator on Carpenter's Escape from New York, Tim Burton's Frankenweenie and Beetlejuice, as well as Back to School, Coming to America, National Lampoon's Christmas Vacation, and Driving Miss Daisy. In 1994, he received the President's Award from the Society of Camera Operators.

He taught cinematography at the Los Angeles Film School and West Los Angeles College.

After a battle with pancreatic cancer, he died at the age of 70 at his home in Burbank, California on February 3, 2020.

Filmography

Feature films
 The All-American Girl (1973)
 Dark Star (1974)
 Assault on Precinct 13 (1976)
 The First Nudie Musical (1976)

Short films
 Peege (1973)

Television series
 Star Trek: Voyager (1996–1997)
 Star Trek: Enterprise (2005)

Videos
 Star Trek: Of Gods and Men (2007)

References

External links
 

1949 births
2020 deaths
People from Tulsa, Oklahoma
USC School of Cinematic Arts alumni
American cinematographers